The Maison de l'Agneau Blanc or simply l'Agneau Blanc is a Baroque house, built in 1696, located at 42, / in Brussels, Belgium, parallel to the Grand-Place/Grote Markt. It has been a protected heritage site since 2011.

The sculptures on the facade are the work of Peter Van Dievoet, commissioned by Jean De Broe.

See also
 1696 in art
 Grand-Place
 Statue of James II, Trafalgar Square

Notes and references

Further reading
 Paul-Eugène Claessens and Julien Cuypers, « Quand Bruxelles ravagée renaît plus belle sous les ailes de l'archange : le sculpteur Pierre Van Dievoet, son œuvre et sa famille », in l'Intermédiaire des généalogistes, n° 121, Brussels, 1966, pp. 39–41.
 M. J. De Decker, « Relevé de l’Agneau Blanc », (deuxième prix partagé, S.C.A.B. concours annuel de relevés de 1924), in, l’Émulation, Bruxelles, 1925, planche 8.
 Guillaume Des Marez, Guide illustré de Bruxelles, Brussels, 1928, volume 1, pp. 65, 81, 82, 89, 90, 92, 112 and 
 Guillaume Des Marez, Guide illustré de Bruxelles, Brussels, 1928, volume 2, p. 182.
 Guillaume Des Marez, « Les transformations de la ville de Bruxelles au xviie siècle et les métiers de la construction », in Études inédites, Brussels, 1936, p. 135.
 Alain Van Dievoet, « Question sur le sculpteur Pierre Van Dievoet », in L'Intermédiaire des généalogistes, n° 147, Brussels, 1970, p. 185.
 Alain Van Dievoet, « Un disciple belge de Grinling Gibbons, le sculpteur Pierre Van Dievoet (1661–1729) et son œuvre à Londres et Bruxelles », in Le Folklore brabançon, March 1980, n° 225, p.65 à 91.
 Alain Van Dievoet, « Généalogie de la famille van Dievoet originaire de Bruxelles, dite Vandive à Paris », in Le Parchemin, ed. Genealogical and Heraldic Office of Belgium, Brussels, 1986, n° 245, p. 273 à 293.
 Park-Mail, Magazine, "Un curieux contrat", Brussels, March 1984, n° 80, p 11. (regarding l'Agneau Blanc).
 Paul Janssens, "Agneau blanc, magasin", in : Dictionnaire d'Histoire de Bruxelles, Brussels, 2013, p. 23.

Baroque architecture in Belgium
Art by Peter Van Dievoet
Protected heritage sites in Brussels
1696 in Europe